The Dave Dobbyn Collection is a 1992 compilation album by New Zealand singer-songwriter Dave Dobbyn. It charted at number 4 on the New Zealand Music Chart.

Track listing

References

1992 greatest hits albums
Dave Dobbyn albums